Your World with Neil Cavuto (written on-air as Your World Cavuto), which debuted as The Cavuto Business Report on the network's launch in 1996, is an American television news and business talk program on Fox News Channel currently hosted by Neil Cavuto. Episodes air live at 4 p.m. ET, Monday through Friday. The show focuses on the development of the markets and the day's events with interviews, current event updates, and analysis. The show has been a part of the Fox News program lineup since October 7, 1996, and is the number one cable news broadcast in its time slot.

The nightly business wrap seen on most Fox Television Stations late newscasts also carries Your World branding.

Prominent guest hosts for Cavuto are Sandra Smith, Charles Payne, David Asman and Edward Lawrence.

Production history

Hosted by Neil Cavuto, Fox News' business news vice president, the program covers the latest breaking news and business stories of the day, in addition to giving analysis on how the stock market moved through the day. It also covers political stories, such as how political actions may affect the markets. Your World is broadcast live from Studio G at 1211 Avenue of the Americas (also known as the News Corp. Building), New York City. In the past, the program was presented in Studio E.

Your World began broadcasting in 720p HD September 28, 2009. This HD conversion was part of FNC's network-wide switch to a 16:9 widescreen format on that day.  Also on September 28, 2009, this program (which was one of the last existing weekday programs to convert to HD) debuted a new on-air look, along with new graphics and a then-new program logo.

Recurring elements 
 Common Sense - Cavuto gives his point of view on a news story of the day.
 Generation Hexed - Cavuto sits down with a group of millennials to talk about the economic challenges facing the next generation.
Mailing It It - Cavuto reads e-mails and social media posts from the viewers, majority of which are negative.

References

External links

 
 

1990s American television news shows
1996 American television series debuts
2000s American television news shows
2010s American television news shows
Business-related television series
English-language television shows
Fox News original programming